Charles Dawson (1842 – 17 March 1917) was an Irish nationalist politician and a Member of Parliament (MP) for Carlow Borough from 1880 to 1885.

Born in Limerick, he was educated at Belvedere College and the Catholic University of Ireland. He was a member of Dublin Corporation in 1877 to 1884. He was Lord Mayor of Dublin from 1882 to 1883. 

He was elected as a Home Rule League MP for Carlow Borough at the 1880 general election. The Carlow Borough was abolished at the  1885 general election and Dawson chose to leave parliament to concentrate on his business activities.

In 1873 Dawson married Katherine Carroll of Limerick city; they had four sons.

References

External links

1842 births
1917 deaths
Members of the Parliament of the United Kingdom for County Carlow constituencies (1801–1922)
UK MPs 1880–1885
Politicians from Limerick (city)
Home Rule League MPs
Parnellite MPs
Lord Mayors of Dublin
People educated at Belvedere College